Noura Hashemi Gharmezi (born September 22, 1983) is an Iranian film, theater and television actress.

She is the daughter of Mehdi Hashemi and Gulab Adineh and the ex-wife of cinema director Siavash Asadi.

She started her professional career as an actress for the first time in 2002 with the film Miss. She has acted in six movies, one series and two plays.

Awards 
 Statue of Hafez celebration of the best actress in the movie Pocket on South Street

 Statue of Fajr Theatre award for "Eliza" in "Banooye Mahboob Man"

References

External links 

 
 

Living people
1983 births
People from Tehran
Actresses from Tehran
Iranian film actresses
Iranian stage actresses
Iranian television actresses